Adrien Pagerie (born 8 May 1992) is a French professional footballer who plays as a left back for  club Orléans.

Club career
A product of the youth system of Clermont Foot, having joined the club in 2012, Pagerie made his senior league debut in a 2–1 Ligue 2 defeat against Brest in August 2014.

In August 2015, Pagerie was signed by US Orléans in an overhaul of the squad following relegation from Ligue 2.

He joined Les Herbiers on 24 June 2017. He played in the 2018 Coupe de France Final whilst at Les Herbiers.

Pagerie played the 2018–19 season with Villefranche in Championnat National, but moved to Cholet in the same division in June 2019, in order to play for promotion. Despite signing a two and a half year contract with Cholet, he left at the end of the first season, rejoining Villefranche for a second spell in July 2020.

On 21 July 2022, Pagerie returned to Orléans.

References

External links
 
 
 Adrien Pagerie foot-national.com Profile

1992 births
Living people
Sportspeople from Clermont-Ferrand
Association football defenders
French footballers
Ligue 2 players
Championnat National players
Championnat National 2 players
Championnat National 3 players
Clermont Foot players
US Orléans players
Les Herbiers VF players
FC Villefranche Beaujolais players
SO Cholet players
Footballers from Auvergne-Rhône-Alpes